is a 2010 Japanese comic drama

Cast

 Yoko Moriguchi as Takahara Akira
 Seiji Rokkaku as Shioya Iwao
 Manpei Takagi as Moichi
 Shinpei Takagi as Mosaku
 Kazuki Kato as Yuya
 Koutaro Tanaka as Yoshida
 Motoki Fukami as Alex
 Masato Wada as Junta
 Takeshi Masu as Nagisa-mama
 Kanna Mori as Tetsu
 Tatsuya Gashuin as Mameshiba
 Akihiro Mayama as Itsuki
 Hironari Amano as Inuman
 Masaki Kaji as DJ Maji
 Hidenori Tokuyama as Kuya

Japanese-language television shows
2010 Japanese television series endings
2010 Japanese television series debuts